The 2014 U.S. House of Representatives elections in Nebraska were held on Tuesday, November 4, 2014 to elect 3 members of the U.S. House of Representatives from the state of Nebraska, one from each of the state's three congressional districts. The elections coincided with the elections of other federal and state offices, including the Governor of Nebraska and a United States Senator. Primary elections to determine candidates in the general election were held on Tuesday, May 13, 2014. The Members elected at this election will serve in the 114th Congress.

Overview
Results of the 2014 United States House of Representatives elections in Nebraska by district:

District 1

The 1st district encompasses most of the eastern quarter of the state and almost completely envelops the 2nd district. It includes the state capital, Lincoln, as well as the cities of Fremont, Columbus, Norfolk, Beatrice and South Sioux City. The incumbent is Republican Jeff Fortenberry, who has represented the district since 2005. He was re-elected with 68% of the vote in 2012 and the district has a PVI of R+10.

Fortenberry considered running for the United States Senate seat being vacated by Republican Mike Johanns, but ultimately announced that he would not do so and would instead seek re-election.

He faced Dennis L. Parker and Jessica L. Turek in the Republican primary.

Dennis Crawford, a Lincoln attorney and 2nd Associate Chair of the Nebraska Democratic Party, ran unopposed for the Democratic nomination.

Primary results

General election

Results

District 2

The 2nd district is based in the Omaha–Council Bluffs metropolitan area and includes all of Douglas County and the urbanized areas of Sarpy County. The incumbent was Republican Lee Terry, who had represented the district since 1999. He was re-elected in 2012 with 51% of the vote in the district that has a PVI of R+4.

Republican primary
Terry faced a competitive primary challenge from businessman Dan Frei, who ran to his right. Despite outspending Frei by around 20-to-1, Terry only won the primary by 2,686 votes, or just under 6%. After his defeat, Frei refused to endorse Terry and he and his supporters openly floated the idea of running an Independent or write-in campaign against Terry in the general election. Frei himself was ineligible to do so, having lost the primary election, but former state senator Chip Maxwell was mentioned as a possible candidate.

On May 21, 2014, Maxwell announced that he would run as an Independent. A former Republican state senator, his party registration is presently nonpartisan. He has said that if he wins, he will rejoin the Republican Party and serve as a Republican in the House. He dismissed as "hysterical" the idea that his candidacy could be a "spoiler" that conservatives are using to defeat Terry by "any means necessary", whether by Maxwell winning or by him and Terry splitting the Republican vote, thus allowing Democratic nominee Brad Ashford to win, meaning that there would be an open Republican primary for the seat in 2016.

Despite collecting enough signatures to make the ballot, Maxwell withdrew from the race on July 24, saying that he had been "begged" by "high-profile" Republicans not to run and didn't want to create a "permanent rift" in the district's Republican Party. He did however say that he plans to run against Terry in the Republican primary in 2016 and noted that "I think this thing's a toss-up, even with me out of it."

Candidates
Declared
 Dan Frei, businessman and member of the Nebraska Republican Party central committee
 Lee Terry, incumbent U.S. Representative

Declined
 Bob Krist, state senator
 Chip Maxwell, former state senator

Polling

Results

Democratic primary
After controversial comments made by Terry in October 2013, Omaha City Council President Pete Festersen, a Democrat, decided to run against Terry. However, Festersen announced on December 9, 2013, that he was ending his campaign because of the difficulty in balancing the campaign with his family and city council responsibilities. Democratic state senator Brad Ashford announced his candidacy in February 2014.

Candidates
Declared
 Brad Ashford, state senator
 Mark Aupperle

Withdrew
 Pete Festersen, president of the Omaha City Council

Declined
 Larry Bradley, professor at University of Nebraska-Omaha, candidate for University of Nebraska Board of Regents in 2012
 David Domina, attorney and candidate for governor in 1986 (running for the U.S. Senate)
 John Ewing, Douglas County Treasurer and nominee for the seat in 2012
 Bob Krist, state senator
 Steve Lathrop, state senator
 Jeremy Nordquist, state senator
 Justin Wayne, president of the Omaha Public Schools Board

Results

Libertarian primary

Candidates
 Steven Laird, Republican candidate for the seat in 1998, 2006 and 2008
 Andy Shambaugh

Results

Independents

Candidates
Withdrew
 Chip Maxwell, former state senator

General election

Polling

Results

District 3

It is mostly sparsely populated but includes the cities of Grand Island, Kearney, Hastings, North Platte and Scottsbluff. The incumbent is Republican Adrian Smith, who has represented the district since 2007. He was re-elected with 74% of the vote in 2012 and the district has a PVI of R+23.

Smith considered running for the United States Senate in 2014, but declined to do so and is running for re-election.

Smith was opposed in the Republican primary by retired Colonel Tom Brewer. 2012 Democratic nominee Mark Sullivan ran unopposed for the Democratic nomination.

Primary results

General election

Results

See also
 2014 United States House of Representatives elections
 2014 United States elections

References

External links
U.S. House elections in Nebraska, 2014 at Ballotpedia
Campaign contributions at OpenSecrets
Andy Shambaugh Website

Nebraska
2014
United States House of Representatives